Deputies (French: députés), also known in English as Members of Parliament (MPs), are the legislators who sit in the National Assembly, the lower house of the French Parliament. The 15th and current legislature of the Fifth Republic has a total of 577 deputies, elected in 577 constituencies across metropolitan (539) and overseas France (27), as well as for French residents overseas (11).

Name 
The term "deputy" is associated with the legislator's task to deputise for the people of his constituency.

Current 

There are currently 577 French deputies. They are elected through the two-round system in single-member constituencies.

In 2019, it was reported that the Government of France wanted to cut the number of deputies by 25%. This reform was later abandoned due to a lack of support in the Senate.

Numbers 

The number of deputies is codified in the Constitution of France.

Restrictions and privileges 
Deputies have parliamentary immunity. They can have a dual mandate at the local level (most notably municipal, departmental, regional councillor) but a new law that entered in application in 2017 has limited the practice's extent by restricting deputies' ability to serve in local executives. Deputies are paid 5,782.66 euros per month.

Eligibility

Lists

References 

National Assembly (France)
Government of France